The European Chamber of Commerce in Cambodia (EuroCham Cambodia) is a non-profit, non-political organization, established to support European businesses operating in or related to Cambodia.

EuroCham Cambodia is headquartered in Phnom Penh.

Advocacy work
In 2018 and 2019, EuroCham Cambodia took a public stance against the European Union's proposed withdrawal of the Anything But Arms trade preferences for the Kingdom of Cambodia. This action was initiated by the European Parliament in response to the 2018 Cambodian general election.

References

External links 
 http://www.eurocham-cambodia.org

Chambers of commerce
Business in Cambodia
Organizations related to the European Union
European Free Trade Association